Luk Kwok Sun (born August 13, 1960) is a Hong Kong sprint canoer who competed in the late 1980s and early 1990s. At the 1988 Summer Olympics in Seoul, he was eliminated in the repechages of the K-1 1000 m event. Four years later in Barcelona, Luk was eliminated in the repechages of both the K-2 500 m and the K-2 1000 m events.

External links
Sports-Reference.com profile

1960 births
Canoeists at the 1988 Summer Olympics
Canoeists at the 1992 Summer Olympics
Hong Kong male canoeists
Living people
Olympic canoeists of Hong Kong
Canoeists at the 1994 Asian Games
Asian Games competitors for Hong Kong